(5 February 1905 – 5 May 1964) was a Japanese screenwriter and film director. After graduating from Waseda University, he joined the Shochiku studio and came to prominence writing screenplays for such directors as Yasujirō Ozu, Mikio Naruse, Kōzaburō Yoshimura, and Yasujirō Shimazu. He also directed a few films.

Selected filmography (as screenwriter)

References

External links 

Japanese film directors
1905 births
1964 deaths
People from Tokyo
Waseda University alumni
20th-century Japanese screenwriters